Susan Miller,  recipient of a Guggenheim Fellowship in Playwriting, is perhaps best known as the author/performer of the critically acclaimed one woman play, My Left Breast and as Executive Producer and writer for the award-winning web series Anyone But Me. For her work on the web series she (and creative partner Tina Cesa Ward) won the first Writers Guild of America Award for Outstanding Achievement in Writing Original New Media.

Career

Miller is a writer for stage, screen and new media. She has received playwriting fellowships from the National Endowment for the Arts as well as a Rockefeller Grant and a residency at Yaddo. Miller won her first Obie Award for Nasty Rumors And Final Remarks. A Map Of Doubt And Rescue  won the Susan Smith Blackburn Prize and the Pinter Prize for Drama. She won a second Obie Award, as well as a shared Blackburn Prize, for her one-woman play, My Left Breast which she performed all over the country.

Her plays have been produced by The Public Theater, The Mark Taper Forum, Second Stage, Naked Angels, Actors Theatre of Louisville's Humana Festival, New York Stage & Film, Trinity Rep, The O'Neill Playwrights Conference, Ojai Playwrights Conference, Plan B Theatre, Hampstead Theatre, among others. Her articles have appeared in O: The Oprah Magazine, American Theatre, The Dramatist,  "Ms Magazine," Girlfriends," and "The Bark."

Miller co-ran the Dramatists Guild Fellows program from 2006 until 2012. She served for three years as the director of the Legacy Project, a writing workshop for people with life-threatening illness, with a grant from the Lila Wallace Fund.  She has taught in the Dramatic Writing Program at New York University; The Writer's Voice at the Westside Y; Rutgers University; Penn State University and UCLA

Activism
In 1977, Miller became an associate of the Women's Institute for Freedom of the Press (WIFP). WIFP is an American nonprofit publishing organization. The organization works to increase communication between women and connect the public with forms of women-based media.

Awards
She won a Robert Chesley Award in 1996.

Works

Plays
 Sweeping The NationReading List"
The Grand Design
Map Of Doubt And Rescue
It's Our Town, Too
Backstory
My Left Breast
For Dear Life
Repairs
Arts And Leisure
FLUX
Nasty Rumors And Final Remarks
Cross Country, 
Confessions Of A Female Disorder
Denim Lecture
Silverstein & Co
Daddy, And A Commotion Of Zebras
No One Is Exactly 23
20th Century Blues

Screenplays
The Last Thing We Ever Do, for Disney;
Blessing In Disguise for Warner Bros.;
The History Of Us for Caravan;
Becoming The Smiths, for Fox 2000,
Lady Beware, starring Diane Lane.

Teleplays
Thirtysomething (Story Editor)
Trials Of Rosie O'Neill (Story Supervisor)
LA Law 
Urban Anxiety (Producer/Head Writer)
The L Word, (Consulting producer/writer)
 Dynasty (Wrote 2 episodes)
 Family

Webseries
 "Anyone But Me" (Executive Producer/Writer)
 "Bestsellers" (Creator/Writer)
 "Suite 7" (Writer, "Good In Bed")

References

External links
"Playwright Susan Miller is Bringing New Generation of Drama to the Net", Joan Lipkin, The Vital Voice, January 19th, 2009 
Author's website

Susan Miller, doollee
http://www.AnyoneButMeSeries.com

American women dramatists and playwrights
American web producers
Place of birth missing (living people)
Year of birth missing (living people)
Living people
Pennsylvania State University alumni
20th-century American dramatists and playwrights
20th-century American women writers
21st-century American dramatists and playwrights
21st-century American women writers
National Endowment for the Arts Fellows
Obie Award recipients
New York University faculty
Rutgers University faculty
Pennsylvania State University faculty
University of California, Los Angeles faculty
American women academics